Hijazhe qabliIt is a village in the larger city of Qus in Qena Governorate, with a population of 122,654 and a size of 755 acres belonging to the Arab Republic of Egypt.

References

External links 

Cities in ancient Egypt
Ancient Greek archaeological sites in Egypt
Roman sites in Egypt
Populated places in Qena Governorate
Qus
Qus Markaz villages